The Hunter 326 is an American sailboat that was designed by Glenn Henderson for cruising and first built in 2001.

The design forms a scaled series with the Hunter 306 and the 356.

Production
The design was built by Hunter Marine in the United States starting in 2001, but it is now out of production.

Design
The Hunter 326 is a recreational keelboat, built predominantly of fiberglass reinforced with kevlar. It has a fractional sloop B&R rig, a raked stem, an open walk-through reverse transom with integral swim ladder, an internally-mounted spade-type rudder controlled by a wheel and a fixed fin keel. It displaces  and carries  of lead ballast.

Factory standard equipment included a roller furling 110% genoa and mast-furling mainsail, teak interior, a stainless steel arch which mounts the mainsheet traveler.

Operational history
Chicago Sailing is a commercial sailboat rental organization that rents Hunter 326s. They describe the design's strong points, "From day one, Hunter 326s have been the most popular boats in our fleet. Not only do they accommodate as many as eight adults in comfort and style, they are easy to sail and safe in all conditions...The Hunter 326 is a delight to sail in all conditions. With a furling jib and self-stacking mainsail, sail handling on the Hunter 326 is easy. All controls are just an arm’s length from the helm. That means you and your guests remain safe and comfortable at all times, never having to leave the cockpit except to sunbathe on the open deck."

A Boating World review in 2001, when the design was introduced, described the series, "the new Hunter 326 represents the beginnings of a complete redesign of Hunter’s entire fleet." Of the interior the reviewer wrote, "The 326’s wide beam and 6 feet, 4 inches of headroom allow you to really stretch out. A pair of settees flanks a leafed tabletop with an impressive high-gloss finish. Hatches and portlights flood the area with natural light and ventilation. The forward berth, which can be closed off for privacy with a solid teak door, continues the decorating scheme ... It might be hard to believe that everything you’re seeing from the interior vantage point is part of a module that was completely assembled outside the hull. A few years ago, Luhrs began modularizing the cabins on its fishing boats. The move produced a significant cost savings that allowed the company to increase the number and level of accessories on the boats, while still maintaining an attractive price point. The modules are continuously tabbed and bonded to the hull for strength and rigidity along their length, width and height." The review concluded, "It’s an easy-to-handle vessel with cabin amenities and construction quality that are truly impressive."

See also
List of sailing boat types

Related development
Hunter 306
Hunter 356

Similar sailboats
Aloha 32
Bayfield 30/32
Beneteau 323
Beneteau Oceanis 321
C&C 32
C&C 99
Catalina 320
Columbia 32
Contest 32 CS
Douglas 32
Hunter 32 Vision
Mirage 32
Nonsuch 324
Ontario 32
Ranger 32
Watkins 32

References

External links
Official brochure

Keelboats
2000s sailboat type designs
Sailing yachts
Sailboat type designs by Glenn Henderson
Sailboat types built by Hunter Marine